The South African Railways Class 14C 4-8-2 of 1922 was a steam locomotive.

In 1922, the South African Railways placed the fourth and last batch of thirteen  steam locomotives with a 4-8-2 Mountain type wheel arrangement in service to bring the total in the class to 73. All four batches had different maximum axle loadings. Through reboilerings, rebalancings and cylinder bushings during its service life, this single class eventually ended up as six distinct locomotive classes with two boiler types and a multitude of axle loading and boiler pressure configurations.

Manufacturer
In 1922, the last thirteen Class 14C locomotives were ordered from the Montreal Locomotive Works (MLW) in Canada. They were delivered in that same year and numbered in the range from 2026 to 2038. Of the four batches built which all differed in terms of maximum axle loading, weight on driving wheels and engine weight, the engines of 1922 were the heaviest.

The Class 14C was ordered at a time when further orders of the earlier Class 14 models were unobtainable from manufacturers in the United Kingdom. The Canadian manufacturer undertook to supply engines of equivalent power, wheelbase and weight, but to their own design. As a result, bar frames substituted plate frames and several other important modifications were made.

Characteristics
As built, the locomotives of the fourth batch were heavier than all three previous batches,  heavier than the first,  heavier than the second and  heavier than the third.

Modifications and reclassifications

Watson Standard boilers
During the 1930s, many serving locomotives were reboilered with a standard boiler type designed by A.G. Watson, CME of the SAR at the time, as part of his standardisation policy. Such Watson Standard reboilered locomotives were reclassified by adding an "R" suffix to their classification.

Only slight alterations were necessary to the engine frames. With the new boilers, the side running boards and platforms were attached to the engine frames instead of to the boilers as in the original design.

Their original Belpaire boilers were fitted with Ramsbottom safety valves, while the Watson Standard boilers were fitted with Pop safety valves. The reboilered engines were also equipped with Watson cabs with their distinctive slanted fronts, compared to the conventional vertical fronts of their original cabs, to allow easier access to the firebox stays. The footplate was also modified to conform to SAR standard practice. Early conversions were equipped with copper and later conversions with steel fireboxes.

Rebalancing
Around 1930, the question of maximum axle loads for locomotives was thoroughly investigated by the Mechanical and Civil Engineering Departments of the SAR. It was found that, among some other locomotive classes, the Class 14C had a rather severe vertical hammer blow effect on the track when running at speed due to an undue proportion of the reciprocating parts being balanced. Modifications were accordingly made to the Class 14C.

The locomotives had weights attached between the frames to increase adhesion. Over time, most of the Class 14C family of locomotives were "rebalanced" by having these weights increased or reduced to redistribute, increase or reduce the axle loading and adhesive weight, by altering the loads on the individual coupled wheels, leading bogies and trailing pony trucks. Coupled wheel axle loading adjustment was achieved by attaching steel boxes, filled with an appropriate amount of lead, over each axle between the frames.

Since they were too heavy for use on light track, the fourth batch version of the rebalanced locomotives was reclassified to Class 14CM, with the "M" indicating mainline service. Twelve of these locomotives, all except no. 2035, were rebalanced and reclassified to Class 14CM. It is not clear which of these reboilering and rebalancing modifications were carried out first, one, the other, either one or together, but in whichever order, all twelve rebalanced locomotives were eventually also reboilered with Watson Standard no. 2 boilers and reclassified to Class 14CRM.

Cylinder bushing
Several of the locomotives had their cylinders bushed to reduce the bore from the as-built .

Service
The Class 14C was placed in service on the Cape Eastern system, working on the mainline to Cookhouse. Some went to the Cape Western system, where they banked up the Hex River Pass from De Doorns.

Works numbers
The table lists their years built, manufacturer's works numbers, engine numbers and eventual classifications.

References

1800
1800
4-8-2 locomotives
2D1 locomotives
MLW locomotives
Cape gauge railway locomotives
Railway locomotives introduced in 1922
1922 in South Africa